Butleria may refer to two different genera:
 Butleria (fungus) Sacc., a genus of fungi
 Butleria (butterfly) Kirby, 1871, a genus of butterflies in the subfamily Heteropterinae